Queen Hyojeong (6 March 1831 – 2 January 1904; 효정왕후 홍씨) of the Namyang Hong clan, was the second wife and queen consort of King Heonjong of Joseon, the 24th monarch of the Joseon Dynasty. 

After his death in 1849, she was known as Queen Mother Myeongheon (명헌대비, 明憲大妃) and later Queen Dowager Myeongheon (명헌왕대비, 明憲王大妃) during King Cheoljong’s reign. After the proclamation of the Korean Empire, she became known as Empress Dowager Myeongheon (명헌왕태후). She was posthumously called Hyojeong, the Accomplishment Empress (효정성황후, 孝定成皇后).

Life

Early life and marriage 
Lady Hong was born on 6 March 1831 into the Namyang Hong clan to Hong Jae-ryeong and Lady Ahn of the Juksan Ahn clan. She was the eldest within four children.

After the first young queen consort, Queen Hyohyeon, had died in 1843, Lady Hong was arranged to become new Queen Consort of Joseon after the mourning period ended. She married Heonjong at the age of 14 in 1844 where the marriage ceremony was held within the palace. 

As she was the king’s wife, her mother was given the royal title of "Internal Princess Consort Yeonchang" (Hangul: 연창부부인, Hanja: 延昌府夫人), and her father was given the royal title of "Internal Prince Ikpung" (Hangul: 익풍부원군, Hanja: 益豊府院君). But her husband soon died in 1849 at the age of 22; leaving no heirs and making her Queen Dowager of Joseon at the age of 19.

Life as queen dowager 
After Grand Queen Dowager Myeonggyeong's death in 1857, she was elevated to the rank of Royal Queen Dowager. Together with the Queen Dowager at that time, Queen Cheorin, it was said that to appease her own boredom, Queen Hyojeong had worked with Queen Cheorin to take care of the younger court ladies in the palace. Queen Hyojeong raised a young court attendant at the Dowager’s residence. The court attendant’s name was Cheon Il-cheong (Hangul: 천일청, Hanja: 千一淸); who was supposedly the last court attendant in the Joseon Dynasty.  

Because the throne was vacant, this led to a distant relative, Cheoljong of Joseon, to take the throne in 1849, but then the king also died in 1864 leaving the throne empty. The Heungseon Daewongun then approached the Queen Shinjeong, Cheoljong's cousin, as he was a distant relative of King Injo and the adoptive son of Prince Eunsin. 

The Heungseon Daewongun was ineligible to throne due to a law that dictated that any possible heir to the kingdom be part of the generation after the most recent incumbent of the throne, but his second son Yi Myeong-bok, was a possible successor to the throne. On 21 January 1864, Yi Myeong-bok was enthroned as King Gojong.

Later life 
The Queen Dowager’s mother-in-law, Grand Queen Dowager Hyoyu, died in 1890. Although she was the most senior royal member, she did not promote to Grand Queen Dowager and continued being Queen Dowager throughout the reigns of King Cheoljong and King Gojong.

It wasn’t until Gojong’s proclamation of the Korean Empire that the Queen Dowager became and held the title of being the empire’s only Empress Dowager of Korea on 13 October 1897.

She later died on 2 January 1904 within the palace quarters of Gyeongun Palace, now known as the Deoksu Palace, during the 7th year of Emperor Gwangmu’s reign.

Her tomb, Gyeongneung, is located in Donggureung, in the city of Guri, Gyeonggi Province, and is buried with her husband, Heonjong, and his first wife, Queen Hyohyeon.

Family 
 Great-Grandfather
 Hong Byeong-chae (홍병채, 洪秉寀)
 Grandfather
 Hong Gi-seob (홍기섭, 洪耆燮) (1781 - 1866)
 Grandmother
 Lady Jang of the Deoksu Jang clan (본관: 덕수 장씨, 德水 張氏) (1781–1824)
 Father
 Hong Jae-ryeong (홍재룡, 洪在龍) (6 November 1794 - 21 February 1863)
 Mother
 Internal Princess Consort Yeonchang of the Juksan Ahn clan (연창부부인 죽산 안씨, 延昌府夫人 竹山 安氏) (1814–1883)
 Maternal Grandfather: Ahn Gwang-jik (안광직, 安光直) (1775 - 1861)
 Maternal Step-Grandmother: Lady Yi of the Yeonan Yi clan (증 정경부인 연안 이씨, 贈 貞敬夫人 延安 李氏) (1774–1795)
 Maternal Grandmother: Lady Yu of the Munhwa Yu clan (증 정경부인 문화 유씨, 贈 貞敬夫人 文化 柳氏) (1777–1840); Ahn Gwang-jik's second wife
 Siblings
 Younger brother: Hong Jong-seok (홍종석, 洪鍾奭) (1834 - 1870)
 Younger sister: Lady Hong (홍씨, 洪氏)
 Younger brother: Hong Jong-seon (홍종선, 洪鍾譱) (1854 - ?)
 Husband
 Yi Hwan, Heonjeong of Joseon (8 September 1827 – 25 July 1849) – No issue.
 Mother-in-law: Queen Shinjeong of the Pungyang Jo clan (신정익황후 조씨) (21 January 1809 – 4 June 1890)
 Father-in-law: Yi Yeong, Munjo of Joseon (문조) (18 September 1809 – 25 June 1830)
 Adoptive brother-in-law: Yi Myeong-bok, Emperor Gojong (고종태황제) (8 September 1852 – 22 January 1919)
 Adoptive sister-in-law: Min Ja-yeong, Empress Myeongseong of the Yeoheung Min clan (명성태황후 민씨) (17 November 1851 – 8 October 1895)
 Adoptive nephew: Yi Cheok, Emperor Yunghui (융희효황제) (25 March 1874 – 24 April 1926)

Notes

References
 
https://www.usfca.edu/sites/default/files/pdfs/app_xii1_4_kim.pdf
https://www.scholarship.edu.vn/wiki/en/Queen_Hyohyeon
https://thetalkingcupboard.com/joseon/royal-ladies-of-joseon-dynasty/#hyojeong

1831 births
1904 deaths
Royal consorts of the Joseon dynasty
Korean queens consort
19th-century Korean women
Korean posthumous empresses